Happy End is a South Korean film released in 1999. Written and directed by Jung Ji-woo, the film is about a woman who has an affair while her husband is struggling to find employment.

Plot
Happy End is about Choi Bora (Jeon Do-yeon), a successful career woman who becomes involved with her ex-lover, Kim Il-beom (Joo Jin-mo). Bora's home life is a snore: she's mother to an infant child and her husband, Seo Min-ki (Choi Min-sik) has lost his job, leaving Bora as the family's sole breadwinner. It's unclear if Bora is with Il-beom just for the sex or for the passion, both of which Min-ki seems incapable of giving. But it seems the jobless Min-ki hasn't been just wandering around parks and reading romance novels as first thought; he knows something is going on, and he's collecting evidence.

Min-ki has been emasculated by his inability to find a job and director Jung hammers this point home with a brief montage showing Min-ki grocery shopping, cooking, and doing the laundry. These are all very feminine jobs, particularly in very patriarchal South Korea. Most interesting is that Min-ki seems content to live with the cheating Bora, very much aware of his own shortcomings, which leaves him willing to be wronged.

Bora is unable to stop going back to Il-beom even though she seems physically and emotionally damaged by their continued affair. Il-beom has realized that he is hooked on her, and is very aware of his jealously-driven actions toward her and her family. Without each other, they have no passion in their lives, and so they must keep going back to each other.

Although Happy End ends rather unhappily, the film is not altogether downbeat. Director Jung Ji-woo has taken the role of observer, using mostly handheld cameras to capture the events in the lives of his 3 main subjects.

The film is sexually explicit, and there is one scene of brutal violence.

Cast
 Choi Min-sik as Seo Min-ki
 Jeon Do-yeon as Choi Bo-ra
 Joo Jin-mo as Kim Il-beom
 Joo Hyun as Bookstore owner
 Hwang Mi-seon as Mi-yong
 Kim Byeong-chun
 Park Ji-il
 Park Nam-hee
 Lee Geum-ju
 Yoo Yeon-soo as detective with sideburns
 Park Sung-il as video store clerk

Production
Director Jung Ji-woo said he did share his thoughts about the graphic nature of the sex scenes with actress Jeon Do-yeon, explaining he wanted them "to feel utterly real and natural".

Bibliography

See also
 List of Korean-language films

References

External links
 
 
 

1999 films
1999 romantic drama films
South Korean romantic drama films
South Korean erotic romance films
Films directed by Jung Ji-woo
Myung Films films
1990s Korean-language films